A Child Across the Sky is a novel by the American writer Jonathan Carroll, published in 1989. It tells the story of two friends in Hollywood and the mysterious death of one of them.

References

Novels by Jonathan Carroll
1989 American novels
Novels set in Los Angeles